Knights of the Cross is a 2002 historical turn-based strategy video game for Microsoft Windows, set in the early 15th century during the Polish–Lithuanian–Teutonic War.

The game is inspired by the 1900 novel The Knights of the Cross by Polish writer Henryk Sienkiewicz. The player can control either the Polish–Lithuanian or the German side. In addition to the Polish version, the game has received English and Russian releases.

References

External links
Official English page for the game (2007 version)

2002 video games
Turn-based strategy video games
Single-player video games
Video games developed in Poland
Video games set in Poland
Windows games
Windows-only games
Video games set in the 15th century
Teutonic Order